The UK Albums Chart is one of many music charts compiled by the Official Charts Company that calculates the best-selling albums of the week in the United Kingdom. Before 2004, the chart was only based on the sales of physical albums. Melody Maker magazine published the United Kingdom album charts for the first time in 1956. This list shows albums that peaked in the Top 5 of the UK Albums Chart during 1956, as well as albums which peaked in 1957 but were in the top 5 in 1956. The entry date is when the album appeared in the top 5 for the first time (week ending, as published by the Official Charts Company, which is six days after the chart is announced).

Fifteen albums were in the top five this year. High Society credited to Various artists was released in 1956 but did not reach its peak until 1957. Two artists scored multiple entries in the top 5 in 1956 (excluding Various artists, who are all different performers under the same name). Bill Haley & His Comets, Elvis Presley, Frank Sinatra, Lonnie Donegan and Mario Lanza are among the many artists who achieved their first UK charting top 5 album in 1956.

The first album to reach number-one in the United Kingdom was Songs for Swingin' Lovers by Frank Sinatra. Six different albums peaked at number-one in 1956, with albums credited to Various artists (3) having the most albums hit that position.

Background

Multiple entries
Fifteen albums charted in the top 5 in 1956, with fourteen albums reaching their peak this year.

Two artists scored multiple entries in the top 5 in 1956.

Chart debuts
Seven artists achieved their first top 5 album in 1956 as a lead artist. Of these, two went on to record another hit album that year: Bill Haley & His Comets and Mel Tormé.

The following table (collapsed on desktop site) does not include featured appearances on compilations or other artists recordings. 
 

Notes
Several albums recorded by the casts of different musicals reached the top 10 and were all credited by the Official Charts Company to Original Soundtrack, despite being recorded by different artists. They are noted down here as Various artists but are not in the "Chart Debuts" list.

Soundtrack albums
Cast recordings from various films and musicals made the top 5 this year. These included Rodgers and Hammerstein's Carousel, The Eddy Duchin Story, High Society, The King and I, Rodgers and Hammerstein's Oklahoma!, Salad Days and Songs from The Student Prince.

Top-five albums
Key

Entries by artist
The following table shows artists who achieved two or more top 5 entries in 1956. The figures only include main artists, with featured artists and appearances on compilation albums not counted individually for each artist. The total number of weeks an artist spent in the top ten in 1956 is also shown.

Notes

 Songs for Swingin' Lovers re-entered the top 5 at number 4 on 6 October 1956 (week ending) for 2 weeks, at number 5 on 5 January 1957 (week ending) and at number 5 on 9 February 1957 (week ending).
 Recordings credited to Original Soundtrack by the Official Charts Company but all had different artists as featured performers. 
 Rodgers and Hammerstein's Carousel re-entered the top 5 at number 2 on 13 October 1956 (week ending) for 5 weeks, at number 4 on 1 December 1956 (week ending) for 5 weeks, at number 4 on 12 January 1957 (week ending) for 3 weeks and at number 5 on 20 April 1957 (week ending). It also appeared in the expanded top 10 for one week at the end of 1959, and two further weeks in 1960, for a total of 28 weeks in the top 10 overall.
 Rodgers and Hammerstein's Oklahoma! re-entered the top 5 at number 4 on 25 August 1956 (week ending), at number 4 on 15 September 1956 (week ending), at number 5 on 12 January 1957 (week ending) for 37 weeks, at number 5 on 23 November 1957 (week ending) and at number 5 on 14 December 1957 (week ending) for 10 weeks. It also returned to the top 5 for five weeks in 1958, appeared in the expanded top 10 for a further six weeks that year, another eleven weeks in 1959, fifteen weeks in 1960 and eight weeks in 1961. This gave it a total of 112 weeks in the top 10 overall.
 Rock Around the Clock re-entered the top 5 at number 5 on 3 November 1956 (week ending), at number 5 on 22 December 1956 (week ending) and at number 4 on 2 February 1957 (week ending).
 The King and I returned to the top 5 for four more weeks in 1958, appeared in the newly expanded top 10 for a further eight weeks that year, thirty weeks in 1959, thirteen weeks in 1960, three weeks in 1961 and a final single weeks in 1962. This gave it a total of 153 weeks in the top 10 overall.
 Rock 'N' Roll Stage Shows re-entered the top 10 at number 3 on 8 December 1956 (week ending) for 2 weeks.

See also
1956 in British music
List of number-one albums from the 1950s (UK)

References
General

Specific

External links
1956 album chart archive at the Official Charts Company (click on relevant week)

United Kingdom top 5 albums
Top 5 albums
1956